Côte Saint-Luc (also spelled Côte-Saint-Luc, and known historically in English as Cote St. Luke) is a city on the island of Montreal in Quebec, Canada.

Geography
Along with Hampstead and Montreal West, Côte Saint-Luc forms an enclave within Montreal. Côte Saint-Luc also has two exclaves sandwiched between Hampstead and the city of Montreal. The larger one contains the residential development north of Hampstead and Decarie Square shopping centre, while the smaller one consists of just fifteen residential buildings on Macdonald Ave.

History

Incorporated in 1903, Côte Saint-Luc grew from a town to a city in 1958.

Throughout the 1920s, the town grew quickly and accepted many immigrant populations leaving Montreal, notably German-Jewish, and British families, plus their descendants. By 1935, the population reached 5,000. Railway development and industrial activities were relocated to the north. An example of this is an old farmhouse, near the intersection of Westminster and Côte Saint-Luc, which today is a strip mall.

Côte Saint-Luc (and all of Montreal Island's other suburbs) was forced to merge with the city of Montreal on January 1, 2002. It was merged with its neighbouring suburbs of Hampstead and Montreal West to form the borough of Côte-Saint-Luc—Hampstead—Montréal-Ouest. In a referendum held on June 20, 2004, more than 87 percent of Côte Saint-Luc residents voted to demerge and Côte Saint-Luc was re-established as a separate city on January 1, 2006.

Demographics 

Local government

Municipal Council  

The City Manager is Jonathan Shecter and Nadia Di Furia is the Associate City Manager and Director of Human Resources.

Former mayors
List of former mayors:

 Luc Prud'homme (1903–1905)
 Pierre Lemieux (1905–1909, 1912–1938)
 François-Xavier Décarie (1909–1912)
 Frederick D. Lamont (1938–1939)
 Donald Fletcher (1939–1951)
 John P. Fyon (1951–1953)
 J.-Adalbert Paris (1953–1963)
 Samuel Moskovitch (1963–1976)
 Bernard Lang (1976–1998)
 Robert Libman (1998–2002)
 Anthony Housefather (2006–2016)
 Mitchell Brownstein (2016–present)

Public services
Côte Saint-Luc is served by a unique Emergency Medical Services (EMS) first responder system. The only volunteer first responder service on the island of Montreal, the Emergency Medical Services responds to more than 3,000 calls for help every year. Advanced care and transportation to local hospitals is provided by Urgences-santé. In 2008–2009, the Montreal Fire Department implemented an island-wide first responder system. It was set to replace the Côte Saint-Luc EMS; however, the city fought to keep their system. A private member's bill was passed in the National Assembly of Quebec to exclude Côte Saint-Luc from the Montreal Fire Department.

Côte Saint-Luc also has a full-time Public Security Department that enforces municipal by-laws and in 2006 launched the Volunteer Citizens on Patrol (vCOP) program that allows residents to help deter crime.

The city's Eleanor London Côte Saint-Luc Public Library was named in honour of Eleanor London, the first librarian hired to set up whatever vision of a library she wanted. She continued in the capacity of chief librarian for 36 years. The Eleanor London Côte Saint-Luc Library is one of few libraries in North America that is open every day of the year.

The Cavendish Mall, now known as Quartier Cavendish, used to be a focal point with famous shopping areas such as Steinberg's, Eaton's and Discus. In recent years, part of the mall has been replaced with single family homes, townhouses and apartment buildings.

Côte Saint-Luc has a Cat and Dog Committee, with the goal of reducing the number of homeless and community animals.

Education
The Commission scolaire Marguerite-Bourgeoys (CSMB) operates two Francophone primary schools—École de la Mosaïque and École des Amis-du-Monde—in Côte Saint-Luc. The English Montreal School Board operates a French immersion school—Merton School, John Grant and Mountainview High Schools and the Marymount Adult Centre. There are a number of private schools in the city, including JPPS–Bialik, Hebrew Academy, Maimonides and Yeshiva Yavne.

Notable people
Former residents of Côte Saint-Luc include politician and lawyer Irwin Cotler, actor William Shatner, and poet Irving Layton. Other residents included Montreal Expos all-star catcher Gary Carter. Comedy screenwriter Ricky Blitt and older brother Barry Blitt, a magazine illustrator, were raised there. Author Gordon Korman grew up in Côte Saint-Luc, as did popular science author and cognitive psychologist Steven Pinker.

See also
 List of former boroughs
 Montreal Merger
 Municipal reorganization in Quebec
 List of enclaves

References

External links

 

 
Cities and towns in Quebec
Jewish communities in Canada
Jews and Judaism in Montreal
Island of Montreal municipalities